Miss England was the name applied to a series of speedboats used by Henry Segrave and Kaye Don to contest world water speed records in the 1920s and 1930s.
 
Miss England I
Miss England II
Miss England III

See also 

 Miss Britain III

Racing motorboats